Sotiris Kouvelas (born May 26, 1936, Amaliada) is a Greek politician. He is a former minister and a former mayor of Thessaloniki.

References

Mayors of Thessaloniki
Living people
People from Amaliada
Environment ministers of Greece
Ministers of the Interior of Greece
Agriculture ministers of Greece
Culture ministers of Greece
1936 births
New Democracy (Greece) politicians
MPs of Thessaloniki
Greek MPs 1981–1985
Greek MPs 1985–1989
Greek MPs 1989 (June–November)
Greek MPs 1989–1990
Greek MPs 1990–1993
Greek MPs 1993–1996
Greek MPs 1996–2000
Greek MPs 2000–2004